The Collège international Marie de France (formerly Collège Marie de France, named after a French poet of the 12th century) is a French-language private international school in Montreal, Quebec, Canada. Founded in 1939 by French expatriates, the school prepares its students from age 4 to 17 for the French baccalauréat. It also provides equivalence with the diplomas of Québec as defined in the framework of the international agreement between France and Québec, enabling students to spend school in both the Canadian and French system. It is one of the two French private lycées located in Montréal, alongside Collège Stanislas.

Education
All students learn three languages (French, English and a choice of either Spanish, Italian or German). Students benefit from theatre, music and art classes, and are also taught physics, biology and calculus. Additionally, optional courses such as Latin or Art history can be taken. The school has kindergarten, elementary, secondary and CEGEP programs.

Notable people
 Maria-Claudia Pena 
 Émmanuelle Merlet-Caron (author) 
 Dobrina Ollivier
 Emmanuelle Béart

External links 

official website: Collège International Marie de France

Educational institutions established in 1939
French international schools in Canada
International schools in Quebec
Schools in Montreal
1939 establishments in Quebec
Private schools in Quebec